The 3rd Women's European Amateur Boxing Championships were held in Riccione, Italy from October 3 to 10, 2004.
This edition of the recurring competition was organised by the European governing body for amateur boxing, EABA.
Competitions took place in 13 weight classes.

Russia topped the medals table, as they had done in the two previous editions of these championships.

Medal table

Medal winners

References

Boxing
Women's European Amateur Boxing Championships
International boxing competitions hosted by Italy
European
Women's European Amateur Boxing Championships